Ocean Airlines S.p.A. was a cargo airline based in Brescia, Italy. It operated cargo services to Asia. Its main base was Brescia Airport.

History 

The airline was established in September 2003 and started operations in November 2004. It was owned by Finrep (40%), Ined Holdings (40%), and ITAL Aviation (20%). It had 100 employees as of March 2007.

Ocean Airlines suspended operations in April 2008, they had stopped flying since October 2007.

Former destinations 
Ocean Airlines served the following at closure in 2007:

Luanda - Quatro de Fevereiro Airport

Shanghai - Pudong International Airport

Hong Kong International Airport

Brescia - Brescia Airport Hub

Nagoya - Chubu Centrair International Airport

Almaty - Almaty International Airport

Bishkek - Manas International Airport

Lahore - Allama Iqbal International Airport

Istanbul - Atatürk International Airport

Abu Dhabi - Abu Dhabi International Airport

Fleet 
The Ocean Airlines fleet consisted of the following aircraft (as of November 2007):

References

External links 
Ocean Airlines

Italian companies established in 2003
Italian companies disestablished in 2008
Defunct airlines of Italy
Defunct cargo airlines
Airlines established in 2003
Airlines disestablished in 2008
Companies based in Brescia